Falkenberg (Central Bavarian: Foikaberg) is a municipality in the district of Rottal-Inn in Bavaria in Germany. It includes the village of Diepoltskirchen.

References

Rottal-Inn